The Compilation is a compilation album by UTP, released on October 8, 2002 through Orpheus Records.

Background 
Juvenile had left popular hip hop label Cash Money Records earlier in 2002 after three consecutive top 10 albums to form his own collective UTP. In addition to Juvenile, UTP also featured Wacko, Skip, Corey Cee, Soulja Slim and Young Buck though Corey Cee would leave the group shortly after The Compilation. Most of the songs on the album were performed by the entire group, though some songs were performed by a lone member of the group. Production for the album was handled entirely by Juvenile himself.

Reception 

Gregory McIntosh of Allmusic gave the album 2.5 stars out of a possible of five. In his review he stated "...For the most part, the beats are pretty ordinary, although the collective does pull out some clever hooks like on the anthem "Less Than a Playa," with its drowsy, lurching undercurrent of samples".

The album was not heavily promoted, but it became a local success and managed to make it to No. 60 on the Billboard Top R&B/Hip-Hop Albums.

Track listing

Charts

References 

2002 compilation albums
Hip hop compilation albums
UTP (group) albums
Gangsta rap compilation albums